Bang Rak Yai is one of eight subdistrict ([[tambon)] ]]) of Bang Bua Thong District, in Nonthaburi Province, Thailand. The subdistricts border (clockwise from the north) Bang Rak Phatthana, Bang Rak Noi, Bang Len and Sao Thong Hin . In 2020, the town has a total population of 9,547.

Administration

Central government
The sub-region is divided into 11 administrative villages (muban).

Local administration
The area of the sub-district is shared by two local administrative organizations.
Bang Bua Thong Town Municipality
Bang Rak Yai Subdistrict Administrative Organization

References

External links
Website of Bang Bua Thong Town Municipality
Website of Bang Rak Yai Subdistrict Administrative Organization

Tambon of Nonthaburi province
Populated places in Nonthaburi province